Julio Fabián Mozzo Valdéz (born 20 April 1981) is a Uruguayan association football manager and former player who played as a midfielder. He is the current manager of Villa Española.

Honours 
 Peñarol 2008 (Uruguayan Championship)

References 
 
 

1981 births
Living people
Uruguayan footballers
Uruguayan expatriate footballers
Central Español players
Peñarol players
Independiente Rivadavia footballers
Rosario Central footballers
Atlético Tucumán footballers
Club Atlético Douglas Haig players
Villa Española players
Expatriate footballers in Argentina
Expatriate footballers in Greece
Talleres de Córdoba footballers
Association football midfielders
Uruguayan football managers